USS Orvetta is a name used more than once by the U.S. Navy:

 , an American Civil War schooner
 , a barracks ship commissioned 7 June 1944

United States Navy ship names